Houston is a town in Kent County, Delaware, United States. It is part of the Dover, Delaware Metropolitan Statistical Area. The population was 374 at the 2010 census. It was named for John W. Houston.

Geography

Demographics

At the 2000 census there were 430 people, 151 households, and 115 families living in the town. The racial makeup of the town was 89.30% White, 8.37% African American, 0.70% Native American, 0.47% from other races, and 1.16% from two or more races. Hispanic or Latino of any race were 4.65%.

Of the 151 households 39.7% had children under the age of 18 living with them, 64.2% were married couples living together, 8.6% had a female householder with no husband present, and 23.2% were non-families. 22.5% of households were one person and 10.6% were one person aged 65 or older.  The average household size was 2.85 and the average family size was 3.24.

The age distribution was 30.5% under the age of 18, 7.2% from 18 to 24, 32.6% from 25 to 44, 17.2% from 45 to 64, and 12.6% 65 or older.  The median age was 33 years. For every 100 females, there were 103.8 males.  For every 100 females age 18 and over, there were 94.2 males.

The median household income was $39,545 and the median family income  was $46,563. Males had a median income of $29,643 versus $20,208 for females. The per capita income for the town was $15,919.  About 1.7% of families and 5.8% of the population were below the poverty line, including 4.0% of those under age 18 and 14.3% of those age 65 or over.

Infrastructure

Transportation

Front Street and School Street are the main east–west streets in Houston. Broad Street runs north–south through the center of Houston and leads north to an intersection with Delaware Route 14. DE 14 heads west toward Harrington and east toward Milford. Deep Grass Lane passes to the west of the Houston and heads south toward Williamsville and north as Killens Pond Road toward Felton. The Delmarva Central Railroad's Indian River Subdivision line passes east–west through Houston.

Utilities
Delmarva Power, a subsidiary of Exelon, provides electricity to Houston. Chesapeake Utilities provides natural gas to the town.

Education
Houston is in the Milford School District.

References

Towns in Kent County, Delaware
Towns in Delaware